Seashell was a  coaster that was built in 1943 by Lidingö Nya Varv & Vaerkstaeder, Lidingö, Sweden for German owners. She was seized by the Allies at Hamburg and passed to the Ministry of War Transport (MoWT) and renamed Empire Condart. In 1947, she was sold into merchant service and was renamed Fredor. In 1952, she was lengthened, with her GRT rising to 452. A sale in 1955 saw her renamed Seashell. She served until 1968 when she was scrapped.

Description
The ship was built in 1943 by Lidingö Nya Varv & Vaerkstaeder AB, Lidingö, Sweden.

As built, she had a GRT of 312.

The ship was propelled by a 2-stroke Single Cycle Single Acting diesel engine, which had 6 cylinders of 9 inches (25 cm) diameter by  16 (42 cm) stroke. The engine was built by AB Atlas Diesel, Stockholm.

History
Glücksburg was built for H C Horn, Hamburg. She was requisitioned by the Kriegsmarine on completion. In 1944, she was renamed Stadt Glücksburg. In 1945, she was returned to Horn's. In May 1945, she was seized by the Allies at Hamburg. She was passed to the MoWT and was renamed Empire Condart.

In 1947, she was sold to the Plym Shipping Co Ltd, Plymouth and was renamed Fredor. In 1957, she was sold to Instone Lines Ltd, London and was renamed Seashell. She served until 1968 when she was scrapped at Tamise, Belgium.

References

1943 ships
Ships built in Sweden
Auxiliary ships of the Kriegsmarine
World War II merchant ships of Germany
Ministry of War Transport ships
Empire ships
Merchant ships of the United Kingdom